Bănița is a commune in Hunedoara County, Transylvania, Romania. It is composed of three villages: Bănița, Crivadia (Krivádia) and Merișor (Merisor).

Notes
 Zoltán Kemény

See also
Dacian fortress of Bănița

References

External links
 Jiu Valley Portal - the regional portal host of the official Jiu Valley websites

Communes in Hunedoara County
Localities in Transylvania
Mining communities in Romania